This is a list of crime films released in 2003.

References

2000s
2003-related lists